Deadhouse Gates is an epic fantasy novel by Canadian writer Steven Erikson, the  second in his series Malazan Book of the Fallen. Deadhouse Gates follows on from the first novel, Gardens of the Moon, and takes place simultaneously with events in the third novel Memories of Ice.  The novel was first published in the United Kingdom as a trade paperback on 1 September 2000, with a mass-market paperback edition followed on 1 October 2001. The first United States edition was published in hardback by Tor Books on 28 February 2005 with a mass-market paperback edition following on 7 February 2006. This is the only novel in the series where the UK and US editions share the same cover; the other US books use a different cover artist and style.
It received mixed to positive reviews, with critics praising the tones, the softer introduction, and the plot. Some critics criticized the way the book starts again in another continent.

Plot introduction
Deadhouse Gates opens a few months after the events of Gardens of the Moon.  Unlike the previous book, which followed different groups of characters in close proximity to one another, the character threads in Deadhouse Gates are frequently separated by hundreds or thousands of miles at a time.

The Malazan Empire is rocked by a cull of the nobility, many being sent to the mines of Otataral Island off the coast of the subcontinent of Seven Cities. However, Seven Cities is being consumed by a rebellion known as the Whirlwind, led by the prophetess Sha'ik from the Holy Desert of Raraku. With the cities being overrun, the Malazan forces in the city of Hissar plot a daring evacuation overland to the Malazan continental capital of Aren. The Malazan 7th Army, under the command of the legendary Coltaine of the Crow Clan of the Wickans, is tasked with escorting 50,000 refugees some 1,500 miles to safety. This legendary march becomes known as the Chain of Dogs and will become part of the legends of Seven Cities. Meanwhile, the assassin Kalam embarks on a dangerous mission and a group of travellers from Genabackis arrive in Seven Cities on their own mysterious errands.

Plot summary

Deadhouse Gates begins a few months after the conclusion of Gardens of the Moon, though few characters and almost no settings bridge the two novels. The main action of Memories of Ice, the third novel in the series, partially overlaps that of Deadhouse Gates.

Prologue and Raraku

Felisin Paran, the youngest sister of Ganoes Paran, a protagonist of the preceding novel, and Empress Laseen's new Adjunct Tavore Paran, is caught up in a cull of the nobility by Laseen, who is intent on removing rival centers of power. Felisin makes acquaintance with Baudin, a thug, and Heboric, an excommunicated High Priest of Fener, a war god, who has been punished by the removal of his hands. The three are sent to an otataral mine off the coast of the continent of the Seven Cities, where Felisin offers her body to the slaves’ self-appointed leader Beneth in exchange for protection for the trio, and becomes addicted to narcotic durhang.

Meanwhile, Icarium, a half-Jaghut immortal inventor and warrior whose wantonly destructive past has been removed from his memory to protect the world, travels in the company of Mappo Runt, a Trell warrior, who is secretly charged with monitoring and, ultimately, controlling Icarium's rage. The two are caught up in a battle between and amongst Soletaken and D’ivers, shapeshifters who can take the form of one other beast or many beasts, respectively, to follow the Path of Hands to Tremorlor, an Azath House in the Holy Desert Raraku, that may offer Ascendency and ultimately godhood. The two make their way through the battle to shelter in the temple of Iskaral Pust, a High Priest of Shadow, who may be mad.

Meanwhile, the Wickan warleader Coltaine takes command of the Malazan Empire's 7th Army, with orders to escort Malazan civilians in the Seven Cities to the imperial continental capital in Aren, hundreds of leagues away, on foot, to protect them from the expected rebellion of the Seven Cities under the inspiration of Sha’ik, a prophetess in the Holy Desert Raraku. The continent's High Fist, Pormqual, refuses a naval convoy, preferring to shelter in Aren itself. The Imperial Historian, Duiker, accompanies the 7th.

Meanwhile, Fiddler, Kalam, Crokus, and Apsalar (formerly Sorry), following the events of Gardens of the Moon, land in Ehrlitan, one of the Seven Cities. Their original mission was to return Apsalar to her home village, but Kalam and Fiddler now plan to kill the Empress to check her growing power by using the Seven Cities’ Rebellion as a way for Kalam to work his way to her. Fiddler meets a Tano Spiritwalker, a mage who uses song to work spells, who offers a song of power that may grant ascension to the Bridgeburners, whom he believes fought honorably in their empire's dishonorable war to take the Seven Cities. Kalam, a native of the Seven Cities, makes contact with the lingering resistance to Malazan rule, and agrees to deliver Dryjhna's Holy Book, which will unleash the rebellion's Apocalypse, to Sha’ik in Raraku. Kalam is tailed by a Red Blade loyalist captain, Lostara Yil, who uncovers his mission. Yil follows Kalam to Sha’ik, watches him deliver the Book of the Apocalypse to her and receive the gift of an aptorian demon bodyguard, and kills her after Kalam departs, despite Sha’ik's guardians Leoman of the Flails and Toblakai. As Fiddler, Crokus, and Apsalar travel separately through Raraku, Apsalar's memories gradually confirm that the Rope, the patron god of assassins, who possessed her as Sorry, was the previous Emperor Kellenvad's assassin Dancer, and that Kellenvad and Dancer must have escaped Laseen's assassination efforts by ascending to godhood over the new Warren and House of Shadow.

Whirlwind

Baudin and Heboric arrange, with Duiker's help, to escape from the mines during a slave mutiny and give Felisin the chance to go with them, and she agrees. En route to the coast, Heboric finds an enormous jade pillar that turns out to be merely the finger of an enormous figure, and touches it with his stumps of hands, which draws his god Fener into the mortal realm. Fener flees and Heboric's hands become tangible, mixing his Denul warren with the magic-deadening properties of otataral. Duiker sends the mage Kulp on a Malazan boat to retrieve the trio from the otataral island, but the company is drawn into a mad mage's watery warren where they board the Silanda, on which they find headless Tiste Andii oarsmen still capable of accepting commands and probable Tiste Edur corpses in the captain's cabin. Soon they encounter Logros T’lan Imass warriors under Bonecaster Hentos Ilm pursuing an unnamed quarry, who inform the humans that they are in Kurald Emurlahn, the Tiste Edur Elder Warren. One of the T’lan Imass sacrifices himself to heal the breach in the warren, and the Imass take one of the heads, but they leave the humans behind to find their own way out.

Pust tells Icarium and Mappo that Sha’ik will be resurrected, as an enormous wall of deadly whirling sand surrounds Raraku and the winds within reveal buried roads, structures, and evidence that the desert was once coastal. They leave to seek her out and find instead Fiddler, Crokus, and Apsalar, who have made their way through storms, rebel pursuers, and the ongoing shapeshifter battle. The company returns to Pust's temple, where his servant Servant turns out to be Apsalar's father, transported he knows not how clear of the Shadow Hound attack at the beginning of Gardens of the Moon. Fiddler, Crokus, Apsalar, and Servant set out for Tremorlor, which may offer a path to the Deadhouse, the corresponding Azath house in Malaz City, where Laseen rules.

Coltaine defeats the rebel army of Hissar, the city where he takes command of the 7th, and begins the march to Aren, which comes to be known as the Chain of Dogs. Kamist Reloe, a High Mage of the empire, rebels to lead a second army against Coltaine's refugees. Coltaine's Wickans defeat one of Kamist Reloe's tribes, though outnumbered seven to one, thus convincing Duiker that Coltaine means to do more than merely flee the rebellion. When the refugees are caught at a wide river between two armies, Coltaine insists on giving the Malazan nobles under Nethpara no special treatment, despite their protests, and it turns out that he insisted on sending the wagons of wounded across the river first in order to conceal the laying of a road under the water that his sappers then detonate when the peasant army starts to cross it behind the fleeing refugees, while Coltaine leads his forces to defeat the army ahead of the refugees. Coltaine's warlocks, led by Sormo E’nath, defeat a Semk tribal god by loosing the spirits of the land against it.

Kalam heads south toward Aren, accompanied by Apt and pursued by Yil. He learns of a traitor Jhistal within Pormqual's camp in Aren from rebels he affects to join as he travels, and joins a Malazan family fleeing toward Aren after he helps them defeat the rebels, including Captain Keneb and his wife's sister Minala, both warriors.

Chain of Dogs

Mappo reveals to Fiddler that he and Icarium have found carvings in Pust's temple that resemble the Deck of Dragons, but with ancient Holds rather than modern Houses, and suspect that the shapeshifters’ Path of Hands may end at the temple itself, and that Pust hopes that he and Icarium will defend it. Servant leaves for the suspected site of Sha’ik's rebirth and Icarium, Mappo, Fiddler, Crokus, and Apsalar pursue him, suspecting that Pust, Shadowthrone, and Cotillion may intend Apsalar to replace Sha’ik as the rebellion's prophetess in order to draw in and kill Laseen.

Kulp manages to open a rent from Kurald Emurlahn to his own Meanas warren, drawing the attention of an undead Soletaken dragon, which grants Kulp the power to heal the rent. The dragon leads the Silanda into a fire warren, and Kulp, Heboric, Baudin, and Felisin fall or leap to safety in the mundane world near Raraku as the ship moves between warrens, on fire. Stormy, Truth, and Gesler, Kulp's escorts, are trapped on the ship. Baudin's heroic saving of Felisin during their flight makes Heboric and Kulp suspicious, and he admits that he is a Talon assassin sent by Tavore to protect Felisin. The company takes refuge in a cave network to avoid Raraku's whirling sand and finds a First Empire city of T’lan Imass, destroyed in hours by the outbreak of conflict between the Soletaken and D’ivers, and signs in a Deck of Holds that the Beast Hold throne is empty. After leaving the city, they meet a mage who identifies himself as Nawahl Ebur but turns out to be the Soletaken Gryllen. Gryllen consumes Kulp, but Baudin wounds him and Gryllen flees. Baudin is critically injured, and Felisin and Heboric leave him behind, only to come across Leoman and Toblakai guarding Sha’ik's corpse; they recognize her as Sha’ik reborn, a mantle Felisin accepts.

As water grows scarce and raiders harry the refugees, Coltaine's group approaches the river P’atha. His warlocks Nil and Nether at one point open a tunnel into a raider encampment to destroy it, incidentally revealing water underground, and learn that a Semk tribesman has a piece of the destroyed Semk god sewn into him. At P’atha crossing, Nil and Nether sacrifice a mare to gift Coltaine's heavy cavalry with strength enough to charge up Kamist Reloe's artificial ramp, and they are helped by the wayward sappers who hid themselves in the ramp the night before; the marines ably guard the wounded and a Wickan band guarding the refugees destroys its attackers, though not without losses of refugees, and attacks the flanking tribes’ flanks to drive them away.

Kalam and company use a stone Quick Ben gave to Kalam that puts them into the Imperial Warren, which is full of bones, to bypass Korbolo Dom's additional army of the rebellion. Laseen's Claw Pearl detects the breach and meets Yil there. Apt, at Kalam's behest, removes 1,300 Malazan children crucified by Korbolo Dom's army to the warren of Shadow and saves one child, Panek, to ride on and merge with her, then trails Pearl and Yil into the Imperial warren and follows them as Pearl challenges the Semk-bound warrior and Apt kills it. Kalam and company exit the warren in Aren to learn that Salk Elan, who claims to be Kalam's friend, is waiting for him with a ship, and though Kalam's suspicious he has little choice but to investigate. Arriving in Aren, Yil's detained with the other Red Blades on suspicion of treason. Keneb joins the city's garrison.

Deadhouse Gates and Epilogue

Icarium finds one of his own time-measuring devices intact and 94,000 years old in the midst of a destroyed First Empire city, but accepts Fiddler and Mappo's assurances that an ascendant or god must be responsible for the destruction. Apsalar and Servant lead Fiddler, Crokus, Icarium, and Mappo to the threshold of what Iskaral calls a knotted torn piece of warren to which his false Path of Hands has led the shapeshifters, but they enter it because Servant can use what's in it to take them home. Inside the warren, they find the Azath house Tremorlor. Icarium can tell that the house is under siege by the shapeshifters and the damaged warren, and plans to fight to defend it. Mappo fears that the Azath will take Icarium, which the Nameless Ones who chose him to guard Icarium would favor. Icarium senses his hesitation and tells Mappo he would die for him, and Mappo tells Icarium the truth about the First Empire city. Icarium tells Mappo to let the house have him if it takes him, even though it would mean eternal imprisonment. Shadow Hounds join them as they approach the House through the battle in its surrounding maze and try to take Icarium after he defeats some shapeshifters, but Mappo, Fiddler, and even Apsalar threaten to protect him, and Pust is forced from his deal to give the Azath Icarium in exchange for not taking the Hounds. Fiddler's conch shell with its Tano song and munitions delivered from Quick Ben by the Trygalle Trade Guild help to restrain the shapeshifters, as does Crokus's bhoka’rala, who turns out to be a soletaken demon who becomes the guardian of Tremorlor after opening the door for the company. The interior of Tremorlor is like a map of all Azath Houses, and Pust and then Icarium and Mappo disappear to other parts of the world before Fiddler, Crokus, Servant, and Apsalar find their way to Malaz City, where the Deadhouse's Guardian Gothos reveals that Icarium is his son and his crime was to wound a warren while trying to free Gothos from the Azath (though Gothos wanted to be there). (Pust, later en route home, finds the spider d’ivers Mogora hiding in his clothing, but uninterested in the Path of Hands, and sees the dragon T’lan Imass Bonecaster, guardian of the real gate at his temple, leave into a warren.)

Kalam meets Salk Elan to learn that the Ragstopper and the whole Aren fleet has been impounded and Admiral Nok arrested by Pormqual, who plans to flee by sea. Minala sneaks on board a trader following the Ragstopper, which Pormqual puts in the charge of his treasurer. The treasurer turns out to be in league with pursuing "pirates", and Elan and Kalam work with the Marines on board to foil his plan. Kalam gets the sense that the captain is under a glamour not to tell him something important, so he contacts Quick Ben for help, who says that the ship is indeed under a glamour of confusion and that he will try to get help to Fiddler and company as they approach Tremorlor due to the active warrens. The ship arrives at Malaz City and Elan reveals himself to be Pearl and that, though the Empress wants to speak with Kalam, the Claw takes care of its own business and stabs Kalam and throws him overboard to face three Hands of Claws in the city, and Minala catches up to him and helps. Apt and Panek appear to force Pearl to retreat before he can kill the captain and crew of the Ragstopper; the captain's mate refers to him as "Carther" before the captain stops him. Kalam reaches Laseen's audience chamber where she's concealed, as he accuses her of killing the Bridgeburners deliberately (she denies it), outlawing Dujek (it's a ruse), killing Dassem Ultor (true but he threatened civil war), killing Dancer and Kellenvad (true but the Empire required it), and incompetence in the Seven Cities (revenge is afoot); he leaves after hearing her defense. Apt and Fiddler's group appear as Kalam and Minala leave Mock's Hold and Shadowthrone takes them all into Shadow to save them from the Claws that are still after Kalam. Apsalar, Crokus, and Servant ask to go to Apsalar's home in Itko Kan; Kalam and Minala join Apt in the new Shadow warren home of the 1300 crucified children; and Fiddler re-enlists to join Tavore's host.

Coltaine refuses the nobles’ entreaty to retake Ubaryd; Duiker believes that it is because the approaching Korbolo Dom is an experienced general and greater threat, whereas Kamist Reloe was merely a mage. Coltaine makes the former slaves soldiers of the Seventh. When the Chain reaches the river Vathar, the Silanda is there, and Stormy, Gesler, and Truth take the most seriously wounded on board. One of Coltaine's officers recognizes Gesler as a former captain, and when Gesler threatens to punch him if he's promoted again, Coltaine punches Gesler and breaks his own hand; Nil concludes that Gesler, Stormy, and Truth are nearly ascended. Coltaine rejects an offer from Korbolo to let the refugees cross the river, but the nobles and refugees cross anyway, and Korbolo sends archers on floating bridges to kill them. Coltaine's sappers are among the refugees and save many, as does Sormo, who's killed in combat; 20,000 refugees die all told. Coltaine promotes a particularly effective sapper to sergeant, only to learn that he's demoted their captain. Past Vathar the column passes through the remains of a war between the Jaghut and pursuing T’lan Imass. The Trygalle Trade Guild arrives via warren to provide food and water from Dujek and friends in Darujhistan and a bottle for Coltaine to crush against his chest when the time comes ("never underestimate the Empress"), and all present realize that Dujek's alleged treason is false and he fights alongside his former enemies against the Pannion Seer at the Empress's behest. One of the three tribes facing the Chain attacks the other two and Dom's army, defeating the tribes but not the army, but declares the Wickans the most powerful after they survive the multiway fight around them. The Chain continues south, harried by Dom's forces; Coltaine sends the refugees to buy passage with a biddable tribe to Aren while the Wickans and even the wounded stand and fight to cover their retreat. Coltaine insists that Duiker keep the bottle Dujek sent him because it is more important that the empire's memory survive than its soldiers.

Aren's gates open for the refugees but Pormqual's army does nothing to cover their flight. Kamist Reloe finally captures Coltaine before the city and crucifies him, but the archer Squint kills him from the city wall at Duiker's urging and thousands of crows arrive to carry off his spirit (which in the epilogue enters the body of a previously motionless infant in a Wickan widow's belly). Mallick Rel urges Pormqual to sally to face Dom rather than wait a week for Tavore's fleet, and the army is surrounded and surrenders at Rel's urging. When Duiker refers to Rel as a Jhistal, Keneb recalls Kalam referring to a Jhistal traitor in Aren, and Keneb flees into Aren. Dom crucifies Duiker and 10,000 other soldiers. Icarium and Mappo later emerge from the Azath warren on the Aren way to find Stormy, Gesler, and Truth searching for Duiker's corpse among the crucified, but Baruk's bhok’arala servants from Darujhistan find him first and take the bottle with his spirit in it and his body. Icarium has lost memory of most of the events of the book and he and Mappo continue their journey.

Felisin and Heboric travel to Sha’ik's oasis with Leoman and Toblakai, whom Heboric says carries chained souls. Felisin tells the others to open the holy book: Leoman sees nothing, Toblakai weeps, and Heboric refuses to touch it and disarms and throws Toblakai when he attacks him for it. Felisin dons Sha’ik's clothing and, using something of the goddess's power, she reads the thoughts of the High Mages: Bidithal abused Sha’ik as a child, Febryl tried to poison her thrice, and L’oric is an enigma, but all kneel before her with the crowd in the end. Felisin accepts the goddess's power but does not give herself up entirely, and adopts a young girl and names her Felisin. The Whirlwind turns out to be a warren that Sha’ik's armies can use to travel quickly. Felisin/Sha’ik and her army travel via the warren to learn that Dom did not take Aren and return to Raraku to await Tavore's advance on their own terms.

References

External links

Band 
Deadhouse Gates is also a death/thrash metal band from New Zealand, that have taken their moniker from Canadian writer Steven Erikson's book of the same name.
2000 Canadian novels
Malazan Book of the Fallen
Novels by Steven Erikson
Bantam Books books